Vannakili is a 1959 Indian Tamil-language film, directed by T. R. Raghunath and produced by T. R. Sundaram. The film stars Manohar, Prem Nazir, B. S. Saroja and T. R. Ramachandran. It was released on 3 April 1959, and became a success.

Plot 

The village landlord, a widower with a college-educated daughter Saraswathi in love with her father's farmhand Mayan, has an eye on the farmhand's sister, Vannakili. Mayan, however, declines the proposal of the landlord who suggests they could work out an exchange of alliances. Meanwhile, the village macho Poochie falls for Vannakili, kidnaps her and marries her against her wishes. A woman of strong character and old world values, she becomes the obedient wife to her husband who whips her to sing for him. She has a stepdaughter who refuses to acknowledge the new mother. With her good nature, the kind-hearted Vannakili transforms her husband and child, and solves all the problems, leading to her brother marrying the landlord's daughter.

Cast 
Manohar as Poochie
Prem Nazir as Mayan
B. S. Saroja as Vannakili
T. R. Ramachandran as Natarajan
D. Balasubramaniam as landlord
R. M. Sethupathi as Karappan
Mynavathi as Saraswathi
T. P. Muthulakshmi as Eesal
S. Rama Rao as Astrologer Subbaiya
M. Saroja as Village Girl
C. T. Rajakantham as Guest
Kallapart T. R. Nadarajan
C. K. Saraswathi as Natarajan's Mother
K. K. Soundar as Police Inspector
M. M. Jayasakthivel
C. K. Soundirarajan
Baby Uma as Kungumam

Production 
Vannakili was directed by T. R. Raghunath and produced by T. R. Sundaram of Modern Theatres.

Soundtrack 
The music was composed by K. V. Mahadevan. Lyrics by A. Maruthakasi.

Release 
Vannakili was released on 3 April 1959, and emerged a success.

References

External links 
 

1950s Tamil-language films
1959 films
Films directed by T. R. Raghunath
Films scored by K. V. Mahadevan